The River Road Stone Arch Railroad Bridge is a historic bridge carrying the former Air Line Railroad right-of-way over River Road in Salmon River State Forest in Colchester, Connecticut.  Built in 1887, it is a well-preserved example of a period masonry railroad bridge, built as part of a state-mandated program for the reduction of the number of grade crossings in the state.  The bridge was listed on the National Register of Historic Places in 1986.

Description and history
The River Road Stone Arch Railroad Bridge is located in a rural setting of northwestern Colchester, within Salmon River State Forest. River Road is a gravel road paralleling the Blackledge River, between the river and the railroad right of way. When the river and road bend to the northwest, the railroad line crosses both, the road on this bridge, and the river on the Blackledge River Railroad Bridge. This bridge is a round-arch masonry structure, made out of mortared ashlar brownstone.

The Air Line Railway was developed in the 1870s, as a more straight-line connection between New Haven, Connecticut and Boston, Massachusetts, via Middletown.  Originally this was a grade crossing, but increasing train speeds prompted the state to mandate railroads operating in it to reduce the number of such crossings.  This bridge was built in 1887, and was apparently one of several similar bridges.  Its arch voussoirs are individually numbered, suggesting that they were cut at a central location and shipped to the site.

See also
National Register of Historic Places listings in New London County, Connecticut
List of bridges on the National Register of Historic Places in Connecticut

References

External links

Railroad bridges on the National Register of Historic Places in Connecticut
Bridges completed in 1887
Colchester, Connecticut
Bridges in New London County, Connecticut
Railroad bridges in Connecticut
National Register of Historic Places in New London County, Connecticut
Stone arch bridges in the United States